"A Love Song" is a song written and recorded by American country music singer Lee Greenwood on his 1982 album Inside Out. In October 1982, a version by American singer Kenny Rogers was released as the second single from his album Love Will Turn You Around. Rogers' version reached number 3 on the Billboard Hot Country Singles chart and number 1 on the RPM Country Tracks chart in Canada.

Chart performance

References

1982 songs
1982 singles
Lee Greenwood songs
Kenny Rogers songs
Liberty Records singles
Songs written by Lee Greenwood
Songs about music